Ntenyi, or Northern Rengma, is a cluster of Angami–Pochuri languages spoken in Nagaland, India. It is spoken in northern Rengma, Kohima district, Nagaland.

References

Languages of Nagaland
Angami–Pochuri languages